The thirteen desserts (Occitan: lei tretze dessèrts) are the traditional dessert foods used in celebrating Christmas in the French region of Provence. The "big supper" (le gros souper) ends with a ritual 13 desserts, representing Jesus Christ and the 12 apostles. The desserts always number thirteen but the exact items vary by local or familial tradition. The food traditionally is set out Christmas Eve and remains on the table three days until December 27.

Dried fruit and nuts
The first four of these are known as the "four beggars" (les quatre mendiants), representing the four mendicant monastic orders: Dominicans, Franciscans, Augustinians and Carmelites.
 Raisins (Dominicans)
 Walnuts or hazelnuts (Augustinians)
 Dried figs (Franciscans)
 Almonds (Carmelites)
 Dates, representing the foods of the region where Christ lived and died
 Dried plums from Brignoles

Fresh fruit
 Apples
 Pears
 Oranges
 Winter melon
 Grapes
 Tangerines

Sweets
 Biscotins (biscuits) from Aix;
 Calissons d'Aix, a marzipan-like candy made from almond paste and candied melon.
 Candied citron
 Casse-dents of Allauch (biscuit)
 Cumin and fennel seed biscuits
 Fried bugnes
 Fruit tourtes
 Oreillettes, light thin waffles
 Pain d'epices
 Pompes à l'huile or fougasse à l'huile d'olive, a sweet cake or brioche made with orange flower water and olive oil
 Quince cheese/quince paste (Pâte de coing)
 Yule log
 Two kinds of nougat, symbolizing good and evil
 Black nougat with honey (Nougat noir au miel), a hard candy made with honey and almonds
 White nougat (Nougat blanc), a soft candy made with sugar, eggs, pistachios, honey, and almonds

French wedding foodways
Bayle St. John, writing in The Purple Tints of Paris (vol. 2) 
"The dishes are substantial; soup, boiled beef, veal, salad, cheese, apples, and what are called, for some mysterious reason, the four beggars — nuts, figs, almonds, and raisins, mixed together."

See also

 List of desserts

References

External links

 The 13 desserts of Provence - by Notreprovence.fr (in English)

Christmas food
French desserts
Cuisine of Provence
Christmas in France
Christian cuisine
13 (number)